Dactyloceras barnsi is a moth in the family Brahmaeidae. It was described by James John Joicey and George Talbot in 1924. It is found in Rwanda and possibly Kenya.

References

Brahmaeidae
Moths described in 1924